OpEPA is a non-governmental environmental education organization with offices in Colombia and USA. OpEPA was Founded in 1998 by Luis Alberto Camargo (Ashoka Fellow, Young Global Leader 2008), Camilo Camargo, Nicole Zangen and Catalina Saravia.

OpEPA's mission is to reconnect children and youth with the Earth so that they act in an environmentally sustainable manner. Through this reconnection, children and youth may become agents in reducing environmental degradation and promoting a more sustainable generation of decision makers. OpEPA has promoted the Children and Nature Movement focusing on breaking the cycle that produces Nature Deficit Disorder.

Environmental organisations based in Colombia
Ashoka Fellows